Talis is a genus of moths of the family Crambidae described by Achille Guenée in 1845.

Species
Talis afghanella Błeszyński, 1965
Talis afra Bethune-Baker, 1894
Talis arenella Ragonot, 1887
Talis caboensis Asselbergs, 2009
Talis cashmirensis (Hampson, 1919)
Talis chamylella Staudinger, 1899
Talis cornutella Wang & Sung, 1982
Talis dilatalis Christoph, 1887
Talis erenhotica Wang & Sung, 1982
Talis evidens Kosakjewitsch, 1979
Talis gigantalis Filipjev & Diakonoff, 1924
Talis grisescens Filipjev & Diakonoff, 1924
Talis menetriesi Hampson, 1900
Talis mongolica Błeszyński, 1965
Talis pallidalis Hampson, 1900
Talis povolnyi Roesler, 1975
Talis pulcherrimus (Staudinger, 1870)
Talis qinghaiella Wang & Sung, 1982
Talis quercella (Denis & Schiffermüller, 1775)
Talis renetae Ganev & Hacker, 1984
Talis wockei Filipjev, 1929

References

Ancylolomiini
Crambidae genera
Taxa named by Achille Guenée